Michael John Sorich (born March 23, 1958) is an American actor, writer and director.

Biography
Sorich has been a prominent and ever-present voice actor for many different characters in the Power Rangers franchise (until the end of the Wild Force series), as well as related or similar Saban series such as Masked Rider, VR Troopers, and Big Bad Beetleborgs/Beetleborgs Metallix. Some of his more well-known roles included the voices of Squatt in Mighty Morphin Power Rangers, Decimator and Zelton in VR Troopers, Roboborg in Beetleborgs Metallix, and Double Face in Masked Rider. He has also had some on-screen roles, with the best-known of those being the role of Woody Stocker on VR Troopers.

Sorich is currently known for his voice roles in the popular anime series Bleach. He directed the dubs for Idaten Jump and for Bobobo-bo Bo-bobo. He had also co-directed the ADR for VR Troopers with Scott Page-Pagter and Wendee Lee.

Filmography

Anime

 Armitage III - Train Driver
 Arte - Ubertino
 Ayakashi Ayashi: Ayashi Divine Comedy - Prisoner, Tamahei
 Bakuto Sengen Daigunder - Daigunder
 Battle Athletes Victory - Ando
 Battle B-Daman - Vinnie, Additional Voices
 Black Jack - Various
 Black Magic M-66 - Additional Voices
 Bleach - Don Kanonji, Tessai Tsukabishi, Giriko Kutsuzawa, Fishbone D, Unnamed Soul
 Blue Dragon - Hippopotamus
 Bobobo-bo Bo-bobo - Additional Voices
 Carried by the Wind: Tsukikage Ran - Daigoro Okuma
 Casshan: Robot Hunter - Additional Voices
 Code Geass: Lelouch of the Rebellion - Store Owner
 Coppelion - Kamata
 Cosmo Warrior Zero - Rai
 Cowboy Bebop - Giraffe
 Crimson Wolf - Additional Voices
 Cutie Honey - Various
 Cyborg 009 - Great Britain/Cyborg 007
 Daigunder - Daigu/Daigunder
 Digimon Adventure - Andromon, Zudomon, Elecmon, Evil Greymon, Tyrannomon, DarkTyrannomon
 Digimon Adventure 02 - Zudomon, Andromon, Gennai (Jose), Tyrannomon, DarkTyrannomon
 Digimon Tamers - Vikaralamon, Dobermon, Sinduramon's Possessed Owl
 Digimon Frontier - Elecmon, SkullSatamon, Neemon, Doggymon, Pandamon
 Digimon Fusion - Deputymon, Damemon, Deckerdramon, Monitamon Elder, Machinedramon
 Dinozaurs - Dragozaur Army Forces
 Dorohedoro - Vaux
 Durarara!! - Asanuma, Additional Voices
 Duel Masters - Benny Haha
 Early Reins - Boss
 El-Hazard - Mr. Masamichi Fujisawa
 éX-Driver - Yamazaki
 Eyeshield 21 - Additional Voices
 Final Fantasy Girl Rescue Me: Mave-chan - Forgetter
 Final Fantasy: Legend of the Crystals - Ra Devil/Deatrh Gynos
 Flag - Nadi Olowakandi
 Flint the Time Detective - Lynx, Ominito, Young Babe Ruth (ep. 11)
 Galerians - Drug Dealer, Guard A, Guy in Lobby, Maniac Terrorist, Priest, Researcher A
 Ghost in the Shell: Stand Alone Complex - Nanao's Classmate
 Ghost in the Shell: Stand Alone Complex 2nd Gig - Additional Voices
 Ghost Slayers Ayashi - Bodyguard, Man, Merchant, Tamahei
 Golgo 13: Queen Bee - Bernard
 Great Pretender - Danny
 Great Teacher Onizuka - Committeeman A, Hiramatsu, Masked Man, Mizushima, Police Chief, Yakuza
 Grimm's Fairy Tale Classics - Various
 Gungrave - Norton, Widge
 GUNxSWORD - Nero
 Hand Maid May - Commando-Z
 Honeybee Hutch - Additional Voices
 Hunter × Hunter 2011 series – Tonpa
 Inazuma Eleven: Ares - Chester Horse
 Jin Jin - Various
 JoJo's Bizarre Adventure: Diamond is Unbreakable - Ryohei Higashikata
 Jujutsu Kaisen - Jogo
 Jungle de Ikou! - Additional Voices
 Kekkaishi - Lord Uro
 Kill la Kill - Barazo Mankanshoku
 Last Exile - Additional Voices
 Lily C.A.T. - Jimmy Hengel
 Lupin III Part II - Olivera Net
 Lupin III Part V - Camille Bardot
 MÄR - Kaldea's Grand Elder
 Marmalade Boy - Rihito Sakuma, Sakurai
 Mars Daybreak - Doctor
 Mazikaiser SKL - Kiba
 Mirmo! - Hanzo
 Mobile Suit Gundam Unicorn - Otto Mitas
 Mob Psycho 100 - Dimple
 Mon Colle Knights - Tanaka
 Monster - Bartender, Mr. Fortner
 Mushrambo - Darba, Robot Cop
 Naruto - Gamabunta, Choza Akimichi, Jirobo, Black Zetsu
 Naruto: Shippuden - Gamabunta, Choza Akimichi, Jirobo
 The Noozles - Additional Voices
 Outlaw Star - Mata, McCoy, Warden
 Phoenix - Additional Voices
 Planetes - Jiraiya, Tarobo, Temara
 Rave Master - Cheeks
 Reign: The Conqueror - Bessus, Zariwari
 Robotech - Sparks
 Sailor Moon - Grandpa Hino (Viz Media dub)Sailor Moon Crystal - Master Pharaoh 90 (Episodes 27 & 28)
 Crayon Shin-chan (Phuuz dub) - Lucky
 Shinzo - Additional Voices
 Speed Racer X - Additional Voices
 Street Fighter II V - Zangief, Mr. Masters (Animaze Dub)
 Submarine 707R - Youhei Hayami
 Super Pig - Ken Carlen
 Tenchi Muyo! - Kamidake (TV2, Movie 3, and OVA 3), Kazuhiko Amagasaki (TV2)
 Tenjho Tenge - Wutan
 The Legend of Heroes: Trails of Cold Steel – Northern War - Giliath Osborne
 The Twelve Kingdoms - Itan
 Vampire Princess Miyu - Chang, Captain
 Wowser - Additional Voices
 X - Additional Voices
 Ys - Dogi
 YS-II - Dogi
 Yo-kai Watch - Whisper
 Yukikaze - Operator
 Zatch Bell! - Garza
 Zenki - Sohma Miki, Enno Ozuno
 Zetman - Detective Sayama (as Michael McKay)

Live action
 Big Bad Beetleborgs - Mums (1st voice), Grenade Guy/Super Grenade Guy
 Beetleborgs Metallix - Roboborg
 Hollywood's Amazing Animal Actors - Narrator
 Idaten - Avery Brundage
 Mad Scientist Toon Club - Dr. Pi
 Married... with Children - Fidel Castro
 Masked Rider - Double Face, Fluffy (voice minus Doubleface uncredited)
 Mighty Morphin Power Rangers - Squatt (as Michael J. Sorich), Terror Toad, Fang, Polluticorn, Pumpkin Rapper, Saliguana (2nd voice), Magnet Brain, Silver Horns, Pachinko Head, Double Face, Vampirus, Hate Master, Crabby Cabbie, Erik and Merrick the Barbaric Brothers (all minus Squatt are uncredited)
 Power Rangers: Zeo - Squatt (credited, as Michael J. Sorich), Boohoo the Clown, Wrecking Ball, Tough Tusks, Cog Changer (uncredited)
 Power Rangers: Turbo - Voltmeister, Shrinkasect (uncredited)
 Power Rangers: In Space - Elephantitan, Crocotoxes (uncredited)
 Power Rangers: Lost Galaxy - Teksa (2nd appearance), Hardtochoke (2nd appearance), Quakemaker (uncredited 1st time, credited 2nd time)
 Power Rangers: Lightspeed Rescue - Triskull, Gatekeeper, Bird Bane
 Power Rangers: Time Force - "Mohawked Mutant" (uncredited), Brickneck
 Power Rangers: Wild Force - Retinax, Artilla, Camera Org, Locomotive Org
 Power Rangers: Lost Galaxy - Auctioneer
 Seinfeld - Fidel Castro
 The Prince of Light: The Legend of Ramayana - Hanuman
 VR Troopers - Woody Stocker, Decimator, Horrorbot, Tankatron, Vacbot, Zelton, Spitbot (substitute voice), Slice Swordbot Brother (first voice)
 You Can't Hurry Love - Drug Dealer

Animation
 Creepy Crawlers - Additional Voices
 Huntik: Secret and Seekers - Master Tantras
 Iznogoud - Various
 Little Mouse on the Prairie - Cal, Osgood
 The Magic Snowflake - Santa Claus, Contrary Santa
 The Return of Dogtanian - Athos
 The Nutcracker and the Mouse King - Additional Voices
 Pucca: Love Recipe - Dong King
 Santa's Apprentice -  Santa Claus, Nightmare Santa, Inspector Stevens, Contrary Santa (US English version)
 Tenko and the Guardians of the Magic - Jason, Steel
 What the Bleep Do We Know!? - Various Character Voices
 Willy Fog 2 - Various
 Wisdom of the Gnomes - Pat

Film

 The SpongeBob Movie: Sponge on the Run - Additional Voices
 009 Re:Cyborg - 006/Chang Changku
 Akira - Various
 Appleseed - Bar Troublemaker, Elder, Soldier
 Case Closed: The Fist of Blue Sapphire - Hiroshi Agasa
 Castle in the Sky - Additional Voices
 Catnapped! The Movie - Additional Voices
 Child of Kamiari Month - Ryūjin, additional voices
 Curious George - Seen It Cab Driver
 Digimon: The Movie - Big Agumon, Gargomon
 Digimon Frontier Island of Lost Digimon - Neemon
 Digimon Adventure tri. - Zudomon, Vikemon, Elecmon, Omnimon
 Gen¹³ - Additional Voices
 Lu over the Wall - Chairman
 Mia and the Migoo - Additional Voices
 Resident Evil: Degeneration - Senator Ron Davis
 Rusty: A Dog's Tale - Additional voices
 Scooby-Doo 2: Monsters Unleashed - Tar Monster, Cotton Candy Glob
 Street Fighter II: The Animated Movie - Dhalsim (as Don Carey), Zangief (as William Johnson)
 The Cockpit - Okiumi
 The Smurfs and the Magic Flute - Papa Smurf (2nd American dub)/Hefty Smurf
 The Toy Warrior - Ciao and Happy Watch
 Unico in the Island of Magic - Melvin the Magnificat

Video games
 Binary Domain - Additional voices
 D4: Dark Dreams Don't Die - Derek Buchanan
 Diablo III - Additional Voices
 Diablo III: Reaper of Souls - Additional Voices
 Final Fantasy Type-0 HD - Additional voices
 Fire Emblem Awakening - Vaike
 Fire Emblem: Three Houses - Gwendal
 Fire Emblem Warriors: Three Hopes - Gwendal
 Grim Fandango - Don Copal
 Heroes of the Storm - Falstad Wildhammer
 Heroes of Might and Magic III: The Restoration of Erathia - Uncredited roles
 Jade Cocoon: Story of the Tamamayu - Village Chieftain
 Naruto: Ultimate Ninja Storm - Gamabunta
 Octopath Traveler - Additional voices
 Sengoku Basara: Samurai Heroes - Yoshitsugu Otani, Harumasa Nanbu
 Shenmue III - Additional Cast
 Silent Bomber - Mercury
 Star Ocean: Second Evolution - Regis
 Star Wars Episode I: Racer - Mawhonic, Teemto Pagalies
 Star Wars: X-Wing Alliance - Rebel Pilot
 Stonekeep - Skuz
 Street Fighter IV series - Gen
 Street Fighter V - Gen 
 The Bard's Tale - Additional voices
 The Curse of Monkey Island - Edward Van Helgen, Charles DeGoulash the Ghost Groom
 The Legend of Heroes: Trails of Cold Steel IV - Chancellor Giliath Osborne
 Twisted Metal Black - Billy Ray Stillwell (Junkyard Dog)
 World of Warcraft: Cataclysm - Falstad Wildhammer, Kurdran Wildhammer, numerous others.
 World of Warcraft: Warlords of Draenor - Additional voices

Staff work

Script adaptation
 Bleach Bob in a Bottle Bumpety Boo Dinozaurs Duel Masters Dynamo Duck Flag Honeybee Hutch Idaten Jump Iznogoud Jin Jin and the Panda Patrol The Littl' Bits Little Mouse on the Prairie Maya the Bee Mon Colle Knights The Noozles Ox Tales Power Rangers Super Samurai Rave Master The Return of Dogtanian Saban's Adventures of the Little Mermaid Saban's Adventures of Peter Pan Saban's Adventures of Pinocchio Sailor Moon (Viz Media dub)
 Sandokan Shinzo Tokyo Pig Transformers: Robots in Disguise Wild Arms: Twilight Venom Willy Fog 2 WowserVoice director
 Battle B-Daman Bleach Bobobo-bo Bo-bobo Cyborg 009 The Cyborg Soldier Digimon: Digital Monsters Digimon Fusion Duel Masters Elsword Eyeshield 21 Idaten Jump Iron Virgin Jun Mon Colle Knights Komi Can't Communicate Saint Seiya: The Lost Canvas Shinzo''

References

External links

1958 births
Living people
American male television actors
American male television writers
American male video game actors
American male voice actors
American people of Serbian descent
American television writers
American voice directors
20th-century American male actors
21st-century American male actors